UT basketball may refer to:

Texas Longhorns basketball (disambiguation)
Tennessee Volunteers basketball
Toledo Rockets basketball (disambiguation)
Tulsa Golden Hurricane basketball